Štefan Molnár (born 4 November 1994) is a Slovak footballer who plays for MŠK Hurbanovo as a forward.

Club career

Spartak Trnava
In the winter of 2020, Molnár had made a surprising transfer to Spartak Trnava, arriving from semi-professional FK Vlčany, competing in 4th tier. His previous career stops have consisted exclusively of lower division clubs. He signed a half-season contract with the club.

References

External links
 Spartak Trnava profile
 
 Futbalnet profile

1994 births
Living people
Slovak footballers
Association football forwards
FC Spartak Trnava players